Adolph Marx (February 18, 1915 – November 1, 1965) was a German-born prelate of the Roman Catholic Church.  He served as the first bishop of the Diocese of Brownsville in Texas from September to November 1965.  He previously served as an auxiliary bishop of the Diocese of Corpus Christi in Texas from 1956 to 1965.

Biography
Adolph Marx was born on February 18, 1915  in Cologne, Germany.  He was ordained a priest by Bishop Emmanuel Ledvina for the Diocese of Corpus Christi on May 2, 1940. 

On July 6, 1956, Pope Pius XII appointed Marx as an auxiliary bishop of the Diocese of Corpus Christi; he was consecrated on October 9, 1956 by Bishop Mariano Garriga.

On July 9, 1965, Pope Paul VI appointed Marx as bishop of the Diocese of Brownsville; he was installed on September 2, 1965. 

Adolph Marx died in Cologne while on a visit on November 1, 1965 at age 50.

Notes

External links
Roman Catholic Diocese of Brownsville

Episcopal succession

1915 births
1965 deaths
Clergy from Cologne
German emigrants to the United States
People from Brownsville, Texas
Participants in the Second Vatican Council
20th-century Roman Catholic bishops in the United States
Catholics from Texas